The 2009 National Pro Fastpitch season was the sixth season of professional softball under the name National Pro Fastpitch (NPF) for  the only professional women's fastpitch softball league in the United States.  From 1997 to 2002, NPF operated under the names Women's Pro Fastpitch (WPF) and Women's Pro Softball League (WPSL).   Each year, the playoff teams battle for the Cowles Cup.

Teams, cities and stadiums

Milestones and events
In November 2008, the Rockford Thunder named as field manager James Sherwood, who replaced Javier Vela. Vela resigned after four seasons.
 
Akron Racers named a new field manager, Barb Sherwood, who replaced Shonda Stanton.

Before the 2009 season, Washington Glory ceased operations for financial reasons.  Subsequently, NPF and United States Specialty Sports Association(USSSA) began a partnership, which resulted in the expansion team USSSA Pride inheriting the Glory's player contracts.   The Pride named J.Y. Davis and Margaret Davis as coaches.

Player acquisition

College draft

The 2009 NPF Senior Draft was held February 10, 2009, at the Cambria Suites Akron-Canton Airport location.  Three-time First-Team All-American outfielder Kaitlin Cochran of Arizona State was selected first by the Akron Racers, after a draft-day trade.

Notable transactions

League standings 
Source

NPF Championship

The 2009 NPF Championship Series was held at Firestone Stadium in Akron, Ohio August 19–23.  The top four teams qualified and were seeded based on the final standings.  The first seed played the fourth seed on a best-of-three series, and the second seed played the third seed in another best-of-three series.  The winners played each other in a best-of-three series that determined the champion.
Day one of play was rained out, forcing the four teams to play doubleheaders on day two, August 21.

Championship Game

Annual awards
Source:

See also

 List of professional sports leagues
 List of professional sports teams in the United States and Canada

References

External links 
 

Softball teams
Softball in the United States
2009 in women's softball
2009 in American women's sports